List of electric bus makers lists makers of battery-powered all-electric buses. Makers of trolleybuses are listed separately at List of trolleybus manufacturers.

Current

 ABB TOSA Flash Mobility, Clean City, Smart Bus, Geneva, Switzerland, A mass transport system with electric "flash" partial recharging of the buses at selected bus stops.
Alexander Dennis Enviro500EV three axle double-decker with Proterra drivetrain
 APS Systems, Oxnard, CA, shuttle buses in partnership with Enova Systems and Saft
 Astonbus, Marina del Rey, CA: E-city midi and full-size models, with a range between 250 and 500 km. Astonbus is the Zonda Electric bus sole distributor in all EU states.
Avass, Full electric city buses and touring coaches, manufactured in Australia.
Belkommunmash, in Minsk, Belarus. Models E420 "Vitovt Electro" and Е433 "Vitovt Max Electro".
 Bolloré, in Brittany, France : Bluebus SE available as a standard 12-metre bus or an 18-metre articulated bus, and the 6-metre Bluebus 22.
 BredaMenarinibus in Bologna, Italy. Zeus M-200 E model, with Ansaldo Electric Drive motor and 288V  – 200 Ah lithium-ion batteries.
BONLUCK electric bus designed and manufactured by Jiangxi Kama Business Bus Co., Ltd.
 BYD manufacturers a wide range of electric buses, ranging from the 30-foot K7M to the 60-foot K11M. In addition, they manufacture coaches and double-decker electric buses.
The K9 is their flagship transit bus (with K9 and K10 chassis/powertrain also used by other bus makers e.g. Alexander Dennis as a basis for localised EV transit buses), and the C9 is their flagship coach bus.
 Chariot Motors* is a developer of ultracapacitor-based electric buses and battery e-buses for Bulgaria and Israel.
 City Smile electric bus designed and manufactured by AMZ-Kutno in Poland.
 Complete Coach Works remanufactured electric bus in Riverside, CA USA. 
 Custom Denning in Sydney, Australia. Design and production of Element fully low-floor battery-electric or fuel cell citybus.
 Ebus, in Downey, California, minibuses:  buses.
Ebusco. Currently producing the 2.2 version in various styles and 3.0 lightweight bus is under development
Eurabus (Euracom Group Ltd.): Eurabus 2.0 (12-meter bus/18-meter articulated bus)
Ekova, in Ostrava, Czech Republic. Design and production of electric low-floor buses, trams and trolleybuses.
 Electron in Lviv, Ukraine. Electrobus Е19101.
 Environmental Performance Vehicles(EPV), previously known as DesignLine, in New Zealand: Tindo solar-electric bus prototype, EcoSmart electric bus, EcoSaver range extender bus.
JBM Group, India: manufactures low floor battery- powered bus model. 
Gépébus, France: Oréos 55E midibus in the 1990s and 2000s, Oréos 4X midibus launched in 2010.
 GreenPower Motor Company manufactures several high-floor and low-floor battery-powered bus models.
 Gillig manufacturers a battery-electric version of their Low Floor Plus model, and a trolleybus version of their BRTPlus model.
Heuliez, in France: 12-metre standard GX 337 Elec bus, 18-metre articulated GX 437 Elec bus
Hyundai Motor Company manufactures 11-meter standard and 13-meter Double-decker bus derivatives of the electric Low-floor bus model, ElecCity.
Irizar e-mobility, in Aduna, Gipuzkoa, Spain: Comprehensive turnkey electromobility solutions for cities. Manufacturer of the ie bus, ie tram and the ie truck
Iveco, in Turin, Italy: EuroPolis model.
 Jiangsu Alfa Bus company, Jiangsu, China, delivered in Italy by Rama Company.
KamAZ, Naberezhnye Chelny, Russia: KamAZ-6282 model production launched in 2018.
Karsan, a Turkish commercial vehicles manufacturer, produces and sells Peugeot and Hyundai.
Kayoola Solar Electric Bus by Kiira Motors Corporation (KMC) in Uganda.
 Kleanbus Limited, retrofits, UK. 
LiAZ, Likino-Dulyovo, Russia: LiAZ-6274 model production launched in 2018.
Lightning Systems, Loveland, Colorado: At the forefront of fleet electrification, powering familiar commercial vehicle platforms, class 3 -class 8 buses and cargo, with our high-tech electric drivetrains.
Linkker, Finland. Design and production of battery-electric buses that use opportunity charging (3-5min fast charging). Highest energy efficiency in the market. Initial development together with VTT Technical Research Nrch Centre of Finland.
 Mercedes-Benz Citaro, battery-powered articulated bus in Aachen, Germany
 Mellor Coachcraft, low-floor electric mini bus based on a Fiat chassis 
 Mitsubishi Heavy Industries is developing electric buses that are capable of battery swapping.
 Mobil Anak Bangsa (MAB) produces plug-in electric buses at Demak, Indonesia. First bus delivered to Paiton Energy.
 New Flyer currently offers battery-electric buses in 35, 40, and 60 foot configurations, and trolleybuses in 40 and 60 foot configurations.
Nova Bus, in Québec, Canada, produces an electric version of its LF Series
 Olectra Greentech in India 
 Optare: Solo EV, Versa EV.
 Otokar in Turkey
 Proterra in Greenville, SC: Proterra manufactures 35 and 40 foot (11 and 12 metre) versions of the ZX5. Previously, they manufactured the Catalyst model.
 PVI, near Paris, France : Oreos 2X, Oreos 4X distributed under the brand Gepebus
 Scania, near Stockholm, Sweden. Scania Citywide BEV
Škoda Electric, Czech Republic - electrical equipment only with Temsa and other bus builders as subcontractors for bodies and chassis
 Smith Electric Vehicles, Kansas City, Missouri, Speedster and Edison electric minibuses.
 Solaris Urbinos 8.9, 12 and 18 meters with about 100 km (60 miles) range and about 120 kWh battery pack, introduced in September 2011. Optional pantograph inductive. 
 SOR EBNs SOR EBN and NS electric busses A modern, low-floor electric bus designed for clean passenger transit in urban environments. A modern all-low-floor electric bus 
 Specialty Vehicle Manufacturing Corp. (SVMC) in Downey, CA.
 Tata urban 9/12m Electric Bus is a modern state-of-the-art solution. ... Tata Urban 9/12m Electric bus - With zero-emission and noiseless operations, the newly designed Electric Bus meets the requirement for cleaner public transport
 Tecnobus, in Frosinone, Italy. The Gulliver model is currently used in several cities in Canada, England, France, Germany, Italy, Portugal and Spain.
 Temsa in Turkey, 50% owned by Škoda Transportation developed two electric buses; one model with a high capacity battery pack and one model with quick charge capability. Also supplies bodies for Škoda Transportation.
 THACO in District 2, Ho Chi Minh City, Vietnam.
 Thomas Built Buses Inc. in High Point, NC.
The batteries can be recharged in one hour or replaced in five minutes. The buses are also to be built in the United States and Finland.
 URSUS in Lublin, Poland, produces a range of electric buses and trolleybuses under the brand of its subsidiary Ursus Bus. 
 VDL Bus & Coach is marketleader of electrical buses in Europe (Sept 2017), with the largest fully electric fleet in the EU. The project of 43 SLFA-181 electrical buses in late 2016 was the biggest transition to zero emission within Europe. Currently the fleet consists of 204 articulated and 12-meter e-buses, with over 4,5 million kilometers done.
 Vėjo projektai, based in Klaipėda, Lithuania, creates, develops and manufactures battery electric buses with the brand name "Dancer" Fully electric 12-meter Dancer buses, certified and registered in 2019, have been operating on Klaipėda’s regular routes since spring 2020 with nearly 100,000 km completed by the end of the year. The e-bus Dancer, designed and manufactured within the territory of Klaipėda FEZ, also won the gold medal in the Vehicle, Mobility and Transportation Design category of the prestigious A’Design 2020 awards.

 VinBus from VinFast.
 Vicinity Motor Corp, Canada, North American supplier of electric vehicles for both public and commercial enterprise use
 Volvo, based in Gothenburg, Sweden, manufactures battery electric buses
 Van Hool's CX45E is based on the diesel-powered CX45, but uses a Proterra E2 drivetrain.
 Wuzhoulong, based in Shenzhen, China, manufactures a range of urban battery electric buses
Woojin Industrial Systems : Apollo 900 (9-meter low-floor), Apollo 1100 (11-meter low-floor)
 Yinlong Energy Co., LTD, China, manufactures commercial bus and specialty EV vehicles
 Yutong, China, Largest EV bus manufacturer in the world.
 Zonda Bus, in Jiangsu, China: YCK6128HEC (12 m), YCK6118HEC (11 m) and the Zonda Bus New Energy (with a 500 km only-electric range and a battery lifespan of above 500,000 km).

See also 
 List of electric truck makers
 Electric vehicle conversion

References

Makers and models
Electrical-engineering-related lists
Bus-related lists
Lists of manufacturers